The women's 63 kg competition at the 2017 European Judo Championships in Warsaw were held on 21 April at the Torwar Hall.

Results

Finals

Repechages

Pool A

Pool B

Pool C

Pool D

References

External links
 
 Judo - Women's 63 kg

W63
2017
European W63